Crenimugil buchanani, the bluetail mullet, is a member of the ray-finned fish family Mugilidae widely found throughout the Indo-Pacific. This species can reach a length of  SL.

Etymology
The mullet is named in honor of Francis Hamilton-Buchanan (1762-1829), a Scottish physician and naturalist.

References

Harrison, I.J. and H. Senou, 1997. Order Mugiliformes. Mugilidae. Mullets. p. 2069-2108. In K.E. Carpenter and V.H. Niem (eds.) FAO species identification guide for fishery purposes. The living marine resources of the Western Central Pacific. Volume 4. Bony fishes part 2 (Mugilidae to Carangidae). FAO, Rome

buchanani
bluetail mullet
Taxa named by Pieter Bleeker